Amor Bravío (International Title: Valiant Love,) is a Mexican telenovela produced by Carlos Moreno Laguillo for Televisa that aired from March 5, 2012 to October 21, 2012. It is based on De pura sangre and En los cuernos del amor, a new story by Martha Carrillo and Cristina García. In the United States the telenovela aired from August 13, 2012 to April 12, 2013.

Silvia Navarro and Cristián de la Fuente star as the protagonists, while Leticia Calderón, César Évora, Flavio Medina, and Laura Carmine star as the antagonists.

Plot
Camila Monterde is a beautiful veterinarian whose life has been torn apart by a tragic accident in which her fiancé, Luis, was killed. Hoping to ease her depression, her uncle, Daniel Monterde, invites her to live at his ranch, where she can rest and recover while caring for the many animals he keeps there. The ranch is managed by Alonso, an ambitious man who sees Camila’s arrival as the perfect opportunity to get his hands on the Monterde fortune; since Don Daniel has no children and loves Camila dearly, he assumes that she will be his heir. So Alonso, aided by his conniving mother Isadora, initiates his plan to win Camila’s heart and marry her.

Meanwhile, in Chile, Daniel Díaz lives a happy life with his wife, Miriam, who is expecting their first child. He has no idea that his fate is linked to the Monterdes in Mexico, or how drastically his life will soon change. Thirty years ago, Daniel’s late mother, Agatha, had an affair with Daniel Monterde but never told her son about it, or that she named him after the man she loved. However, Don Daniel recently began suspecting that Agatha’s son could be his only child. Daniel suddenly receives a letter stating that he has come into a substantial inheritance and must travel to Mexico to claim it. Surprised and curious, he’s about to make the trip when a vicious lie disrupts his plans and lands him in prison, causing him to lose the inheritance and his family.

Sometime later, deeply bitter and hungry for revenge, Daniel travels to Mexico determined to destroy the Monterde family, which he blames for his terrible misfortune. Assuming a false identity, he takes a job at the Monterde ranch to be close to his prey. His vengeance is perfectly planned except for one unexpected development: he and Camila fall passionately in love and that changes everything.

Cast

Main

Also main

Recurring

Production
Production of Amor Bravío officially started on February 7, 2012. The program was originally called Lidia de Amor and was expected to have 220 episodes.

Reception
In the United States the last episode reached 6.2 million Viewers.

Ratings

Awards and nominations

References

External links

Mexican telenovelas
Spanish-language telenovelas
Televisa telenovelas
2012 Mexican television series debuts
2012 telenovelas
2012 Mexican television series endings
Television series reboots